Adoration of the Christ Child is an oil-on-panel painting executed in 1523 by Lorenzo Lotto and signed at the bottom right "L. Lotus / 1523". It is now in the National Gallery of Art in Washington. 

The painting was produced for private devotion. X-ray examination has shown that the left side was reworked by Lotto himself.  

By the 20th century it was in Count Morlani's private collection in Bergamo. He sold it to Bononi in Milan, where it was acquired by Alessandro Contini-Bonacossi. In 1937 Samuel H. Kress acquired it and took it to New York, giving it to its present owner two years later.

References

External links
 Federico Terzi, Per una Theologia Crucis artistica: alcuni spunti tra Lotto e Bach in Intersezioni, 40, 2020/1, pp. 57-75.

1523 paintings
Paintings of the Madonna and Child by Lorenzo Lotto
Collections of the National Gallery of Art
Paintings of Saint Joseph
Nativity of Jesus in art